This is a list of Tamil Nadu Government laws and rules.

Tamil Nadu Government Laws and Rules 

Tamil Nadu Government Laws & Rules includes as follows:

 Act 
 Manual
 Regulations

The Tamil Nadu Government Laws & Rules as two types as follows:

 Internal – for Tamil Nadu Government internal purposes
 Public

Internal

Tamil Nadu Government – General Manuals 
 The Tamil Nadu Secretariat Office Manual
 The Tamil Nadu Services Manuals 1970
 The Tamil Nadu Services Manuals I
 The Tamil Nadu Services Manuals II
 The Tamil Nadu Services Manuals III
 The Tamil Nadu Services Manuals IV
 The Fundamental Rules of the Tamil Nadu Government
 The Tamil Nadu Government Business Rules and Secretariat Instructions, 1978
 The Tamil Nadu Secretariat Service Rules, 1933
 The Tamil Nadu General Service Rules
 The Tamil Nadu Basic Service Rules
 The Tamil Nadu Leave Rules, 1933
 The Tamil Nadu Pension Rules, 1978
 The Tamil Nadu Government Servants Conduct Rules, 1973
 The Tamil Nadu Civil Services (Discipline and Appeal) Rules
 The Tamil Nadu State and Subordinate Services Rules, 1987
 The Tamil Nadu General Sub-ordinate Service Rules.

Tamil Nadu Government – Departmental Wise Rules 

 PWD: Tamil Nadu Architect Service Rules
 
 PWD: Rules forTamil Nadu Boiler Service
 
 Stationery and Printing Department : Services Rules
 
 Public and Rehabilitation Department : Service Rules
 
 Public (Buildings) Department – Special Rules Amendment – 2011
 
 Directorate of Social Welfare – Service Rules
 
 Secretariat – Welfare of the Differently Abled Person Department – Service Rules
 
 Secretariat – Agriculture Department – Service Rules
 
 Tamil Nadu State Judicial Service (Cadre and Recruitment) Rules, 2007
 
 Adhoc Rules, Special Rules – Prohibition and Excise Department
 
 Youth Welfare and Sports Development Department – Service Rules – Sports Development Authority of Tamil Nadu
 
 Adhoc Rules, Special Rules – Inspectorate of Factories
 
 Registration of Births and Deaths Act 1969 (Act No. 18 of 1969)
 
 Tamil Nadu Registration of Births and Deaths Rules 2000 
 G.O Ms. No. 528 Health and Family Welfare Dated, 29 December 1999
 
 Adhoc Rules and Special Rules – Information and Public Relations Department
 
 Service Rules – BC, MBC and Minorities Welfare Department
 
 Implementation of Scheduled Tribes and Other Traditional Forest Dwellers (Recognition of Forest) Act, 2006 [English] [Tamil]
 
 Tamil Nadu Molasses Control and Regulation Rules 1958 – Prohibition & Excise Dept
 TN Liquor (License and Permit) Rules 1981 – Prohibition & Excise Dept
 The Tamil Nadu Spirituous Preparations (Control) Rules, 1984. – Prohibition & Excise Dept
 The Tamil Nadu Narcotic Drugs Rules, 1985 – Prohibition & Excise Dept
 The Tamil Nadu Liquor Retail Vending (In Shops And Bars)
 Rules, 2003 – Prohibition & Excise Dept
 Tamil Nadu Distillery Rules, 1981 – Prohibition & Excise Dept
 The Tamil Nadu Disposal of Articles (Confiscated under theTamil Nadu Prohibition Act) Rules, 1979 – Prohibition & Excise Dept
 Denatured Spirit – FP Rules 1959 (Updated) – Prohibition & Excise Dept
 Tamil Nadu Indian-Made Foreign Spirits (Manufacture) Rules, 1981 
 
 The Medicinal and Toilet Preparations (Excise Duties) Rules, 1956
 Tamil Nadu Rectified Spirit Rules, 1959
 The Tamil Nadu Liquor (Transit) Rules, 1982
 Tamil Nadu Mass Wine Rules, 1984
 Tamil Nadu Spirituous Essences Rules – 1972
 Tamil Nadu Wine (Manufacture) Rules, 2006 .
 The Tamil Nadu Brewery Rules, 1983.
 The Tamil Nadu Liquor (Supply by Wholesale) Rules, 1983.
 Service Rules – Animal Husbandry, Dairying and Fisheries Department – Dairy Wing
 Service Rules – Animal Husbandry, Dairying and Fisheries Department
 Service Rules – Directorate of Adi Dravidar Welfare
 Service Rules – Commissionerate of Tourism
 Service Rules – Commissionerate of Art and Culture
 Service Rules – Commissionerate of Archaeology
 Ad hoc Rules – Basic Service
 Service Rules – Ad hoc Rules (all posts) – Directorate of Tamil Etymological Dictionary Project
 Service Rules – Ad hoc Rules (all posts) – Directorate of Tamil Development
 Tamil Nadu General Services – Adhoc Rules (Finance) – JS & ADS
 Service Rules – Industries and Commerce
 Service Rules – Tamil Nadu Industries Services
 Ad hoc Rules – Government Museums
 Special Rules – Electrical Inspectorate (Energy Department) 
 Special Rules  – Government Museums
 Department of Law – Service Rules 
 Tamil Nadu Government Gazette :  Ordinance No.2 of 2008 on observing Thai one as new year Day  
 Department of Tourism and Culture – Service Rules  
 Department of Town and Country Planning – Service Rules 
 Department of Transport (Motor Vehicles Maintenance Dept) – Service Rules 
 Department of Employment and Training – Service Rules
 Central Motor Vehicles (Amendment) Rules, 2007  
 An Ordinance to make special provisions for Chennai Metropolitan Planning Area for a period of one year and for matters connected therewith or incidental thereto
 Tamil Nadu Government Gazette :  Ordinance No.4 of 2007 on Reservations for Backward Class Muslims and Backward Class Christians
 The General Provident Fund Rules
 TN Building and other Construction Workers 
 (Regulation of Employment and conditions of Service) Rules, 2006 
 TN Acts and Ordinances:  
 No. 10 – Forcible Conversion of Religion (Repeal) Act, 2006, 
 No.11 – Essential Services Maintenance (Repeal) Act, 2006 and 
 No.12 – Backward Classes, Scheduled Castes and Scheduled Tribes (Reservation of Seats in Private Educational Institutions) Act, 2006

3 

 No. 13 – Learning of Tamil as one of the subjects in all schools in the state of Tamil Nadu.
 Tamil Nadu Travelling Allowance Rules – 2005   &  Annexure
 Tamil Nadu Fiscal Responsibility Act 2003 (With Amendment).
 Prohibition of Charging Exorbitant Interest Act No.38 of 2003
 Tax on Consumption or Sale of Electricity Act, 2003.
 Draft TN Value Added Tax Bill, 2003.
 Emigration (Amendment) Rules- 2002.
 Employment Exchange Act
 Groundwater Acts.
 P & A R Service Rules
 Planning, Development and Special Initiatives Department Service Rules
 Higher Education Department Service Rules
 Youth Welfare and Sports Development Department – Service Rules – Extract of Rules relating to NCC Department
 Right to Information Act
 Tender Rules
 Geology & Mining Rules
 Ordinance No. 2 of 2003 of Law Department
 Ordinance No. 2 of 2004 of Law Department
 Cancellation Notification under Tamil Nadu District Municipalities Act and Constitution of certain Town Panchayats as Village Panchayats under Tamil Nadu Panchayats Act
 Tamil Nadu District Municipal
ities (Amendment) Ordinance 2004
 Central Acts & Ordinances – Ordinances No. 1 and 2 of 2004
 Tamil Nadu Acts & Ordinances – Ordinances No. 9,10,11,12 and 13 of 2004
 Environment and Forest Department – Service Rules
 Handlooms and Textiles – Subordinate Services Rules
 Ministerial Service Rules / Adhoc Rules – Revenue Department
 Finance Department – Service Rules

General Rules 
 No. 13 – Learning of Tamil as one of the subjects in all schools in the state of Tamil Nadu
 Tamil Nadu Travelling Allowance Rules – 2005  &  Annexure

Service Rules 
 No. 13 – Learning of Tamil as one of the subjects in all schools in the state of Tamil Nadu
 Tamil Nadu Travelling Allowance Rules – 2017  &  Annexure

Ad hoc Rules 
 No. 13 – Learning of Tamil as one of the subjects in all schools in the state of Tamil Nadu
 Tamil Nadu Travelling Allowance Rules – 2005  &  Annexure

Ordinance and Others 
 No. 13 – Learning of Tamil as one of the important 
subjects in all schools in the state of Tamil Nadu
 Tamil Nadu Travelling Allowance Rules – 2005   &  Annexure

Home, Prohibition and Excise 
 Police
 Tamil Nadu Police Subordinate Service Rules
 Tamil Nadu Police Subordinate Service (D&A) Rules
 Tamil Nadu Special Police Subordinate Service Rules

 Prohibition and Excise
 Tamil Nadu Rectified Spirit Rules, 2000.
 Tamil Nadu Distillery Rules, 1981.
 Tamil Nadu I.M.F.S (Manufacture) Rules, 1981.
 Tamil Nadu Brewery Rules, 1983.
 Tamil Nadu Mass Wine Rules, 1984.
 Tamil Nadu Liquor (licence and Permit) Rules 1981.
 Tamil Nadu Liquor (Supply by whole sale) Rules, 1983.
 Tamil Nadu Liquor (Retail Vending in shops & Bars) Rules, 2003.
 Tamil Nadu Liquor (Transit) Rules, 1982
 Tamil Nadu Spirituous Essences Rules, 1972
 Tamil Nadu Spirituous Preparation (Control) Rules, 1984
 Tamil Nadu Wine (Manufacture) Rules, 2006
 Tamil Nadu Denatured Spirit, Methyl Alcohol and Varnish (French Polish) Rules 1959.
 Tamil Nadu Molasses Control and Regulation Rules, 1958.
 Tamil Nadu Narcotic Drug Rules, 1985.
 Tamil Nadu Medicinal and Toilet preparations (Excise Duties) Rules, 1956.
 Tamil Nadu Disposal of Articles (Confiscated under Tamil Nadu Prohibition Act)Rules, 1979.

 Rules for Tamil Nadu Boiler Service

Tamil Development and Information 
 Tamil Nadu Government Press Sub-Ordinate Service Special Rules
 Tamil Nadu Stationery and Printing Service Special Rules

Public 
 Tamil Nadu Government Press Sub-Ordinate Service Special Rules
 Tamil Nadu Stationery and Printing Sub-Ordinate Service Rules
 Tamil Nadu Stationery and Printing Service Special Rules

Agriculture 
 Special Rules for Agricultural Extension Subordinate Service
 Tamil Nadu Agricultural Subordinate Service
 Tamil Nadu Agriculture Service
 Tamil Nadu Agricultural Marketing Service
 Tamil Nadu Agricultural Marketing Subordinate Service Rules
 Special Rules for Tamil Nadu Agricultural Marketing Subordinate Service
 Special Rules for Tamil Nadu Agricultural Marketing Service
 Tamil Nadu Agricultural University – Anbu

Youth Welfare and Sports Development 
 Sports Development Authority of Tamil Nadu Service Rules, 1998

Tamil Nadu Government Codes 
 The Tamil Nadu Financial Code
 The Tamil Nadu Treasury Code
 The Tamil Nadu Account Code
 The Tamil Nadu Forest Department Account Code
 The Tamil Nadu Public Works Account Code

Public 

There are several laws under 40 Secretariat Departments as follows:

 Department of Adi Dravidar and Tribal Welfare (Tamil Nadu)	
 Department of Agriculture (Tamil Nadu)
 Department of Animal Husbandry, Dairying and Fisheries (Tamil Nadu) 
 Department of Backward Classes, Most Backward Classes and Minorities Welfare (Tamil Nadu)
 Department of Co-operation, Food and Consumer Protection (Tamil Nadu)
 Department of Commercial Taxes and Registration (Tamil Nadu)
 Department of Energy (Tamil Nadu)
 Department of Environment and Forests (Tamil Nadu)
 Department of Finance (Tamil Nadu)
 Department of Handlooms, Handicrafts, Textiles and Khadi (Tamil Nadu)
 Department of Health and Family Welfare (Tamil Nadu)
 Department of Higher Education (Tamil Nadu) 
 Department of Highways and Minor Ports (Tamil Nadu) 
 Department of Home, Prohibition and Excise (Tamil Nadu) 
 Department of Industries (Tamil Nadu) 
 Department of Information Technology (Tamil Nadu) 
 Department of Labour and Employment (Tamil Nadu) 
 Department of Law (Tamil Nadu) 
 Department of Legislative Assembly (Tamil Nadu) 
 Department of Municipal Administration and Water Supply (Tamil Nadu) 
 Department of Micro, Small and Medium Enterprises (Tamil Nadu) (formerly Small Industries Department )
 Department of Personnel and Administrative Reforms (Tamil Nadu) 
 Department of Planning, Development and Special Initiatives (Tamil Nadu) 
 Department of Public (Tamil Nadu) 
 Department of Public Works (Tamil Nadu)
 Department of Revenue (Tamil Nadu) 
 Department of Rural Development and Panchayat (Tamil Nadu) 
 Department of School Education (Tamil Nadu)
 Department of Social Reforms Department (Tamil Nadu)
 Department of Social Welfare and Nutritious Meal Programme (Tamil Nadu) 
 Department of Special Programme Implementation (Tamil Nadu) 
 Department of Tourism and Culture (Tamil Nadu) 
 Department of Tamil Development, Religious Endowments and Information (Tamil Nadu) 
 Department of Transport (Tamil Nadu)
 Department of Youth Welfare and Sports (Tamil Nadu)
 Department of Welfare of Differently Abled Persons (Tamil Nadu)

Education

Universities Acts

Others 

 The Indian Medical Degrees (Tamil Nadu Amendment) Act, 1940
 The Tamil Nadu Drugs and Other Stores (Unlawful Possession) Act, 1986
 The Tamil Nadu Educational Development Day (Declaration and Celebration) Act, 2006
 The Tamil Nadu Educational Institutions (Prohibition of Collection of Capitation Fee) Act, 1992
 The Tamil Nadu Educational Institutions (Temporary Control of Property) Act, 1949
 The Tamil Nadu Elementary Education Act, 1920
 The Tamil Nadu Private Colleges (Regulation) Act, 1976
 The Tamil Nadu Private Educational Institutions (Regulation) Act, 1966
 Tamil Nadu State Council for Higher Education Act 1992 mathan

Department

Education 

 The Indian Medical Degrees (Tamil Nadu Amendment) Act, 1940
 The Tamil Nadu Drugs and Other Stores (Unlawful Possession) Act, 1986
 The Tamil Nadu Educational Development Day (Declaration and Celebration) Act, 2006

Municipal Administration and Water Supply 

 The Bhavanisagar Township Act, 1954
 The Courtallam Township Act, 1954
 The Courtallam Township (Validation of Taxes and Library Cess) Act, 1960
 The Chennai City Municipal Corporation Act, 1919
 The Coimbatore City Municipal Corporation Act, 1981
 The Coimbatore Municipal Council (Appointment of Special Officers) Act, 1975
 The Erode City Municipal Corporation Act, 2008

Tamil Nadu Government Acts by Year

1983

General

1 
 Tamil Nadu General Sales Tax Act, 1959
 Tamil Nadu General Sales Tax (Emergency Provisions) Act, 1958
 Tamil Nadu General Sales Tax (Special Provisions And Validation) Act, 1998
 Tamil Nadu General Sales Tax (Special Provisions) Act, 1964
 Tamil Nadu General Sales Tax (Turnover and Assessment) Rules Validation Act, 1959
 Tamil Nadu General Sales Tax (Validation) Act, 1987

2 

 Tamil Nadu Palm Products Development Board Act, 1994

Education 

 Tamil Nadu Agricultural University Act, 1971
 The Alagappa University Act, 1985
 The Anna University Act, 1978
 The Anna University Coimbatore Act, 2006
 The Anna University, Tiruchirappalli Act, 2006
 The Anna University, Tirunelveli Act, 2007
 The Annamalai University Act, 1928
 The Bharathiar University Act, 1981
 The Bharathidasan University Act, 1981

Local Bodies Act 

 The Bhavanisagar Township Act, 1954
 The Courtallam Township Act, 1954
 The Courtallam Township (Validation of Taxes and Library Cess) Act, 1960
 Chennai City Municipal Corporation Act, 1919
 The Coimbatore City Municipal Corporation Act, 1981
 The Coimbatore Municipal Council (Appointment of Special Officers) Act, 1975
 The Erode City Municipal Corporation Act, 2008

2 o 

 Tamil Nadu Protection of Tanks and Eviction of Encroachment Act, 2007
 Tamil Nadu Land Encroachment Act, 1905
 Tamil Nadu Public Buildings (Licensing) Act, 1965
 Tamil Nadu Nuclear Installations (Regulation of Buildings and Use of Land) Act, 1978
 Tamil Nadu Warehouses Act, 1951
 Tamil Nadu Protection of Interests of Depositors (In Financial Establishments) Act, 1997
 Tamil Nadu Shops and Establishments Act, 1947
 Tamil Nadu Urban Land (Ceiling and Regulations) Act, 1978
 Tamil Nadu Buildings (Lease and Rent Control) Act, 1960
 Tamil Nadu Cultivating Tenants (Protection) Act, 1955
 Madras City Tenants Protection Act, 1921
 Madras City Tenants Protection (Amendment) Act, 1994
 Chennai City Police (Extension to the Chennai City Suburban Area) Act, 2008
 Chennai City Police (Extension to the Cities of Salem, Tiruchirappalli and Tirunelveli) Act, 1997
 Chennai Metropolitan Area Groundwater (Regulation) Act, 1987
 City of Madras Alteration of Name Act, 1991
 City of Madras (Alteration of Name) Act, 1996
 Chennai City Police Extension to the City of Madurai and Coimbatore Act
 Chennai Metropolitan Water Supply and Sewerage Act, 1978
 Jaina Succession Act, 1928
 Mappilla Succession Act, 1918
 Tamil Nadu Fire Service Act, 1985
 Indian Bar Council (Tamil Nadu Amendment) Act, 1954
 The Agriculturists' Loans (Tamil Nadu Amendment) Act, 1935
 The Bar Councils and Legal Practitioners (Tamil Nadu Amendment) Act, 1947
 The Bhavani Reservoir Irrigation Cess Act, 1933
 The Cattle-Trespass (Tamil Nadu Amendment) Act, 1957
 The Code of Civil Procedure (Tamil Nadu Amendment) Act, 1950
 The Cotton Ginning and Pressing Factories (Tamil Nadu Amendment) Act, 1948
 The Cotton Transport (Tamil Nadu Amendment) Act, 1948
 The East and West Tanjore Sessions Divisions (Validation) Act, 1931
 The Evacuee Interest (Separation) Tamil Nadu Supplementary Act, 1961
 The Factories (Tamil Nadu Amendment) Act, 2007
 The Glanders and Farcy (Tamil Nadu Amendment) Act, 1965
 The Gudalur Compensation for Tenants Improvements Act, 1931
 The Gudalur Janmam Estates (Abolition and Conversion into Ryotwari) Act, 1969
 The Hindu Marriage (Tamil Nadu) (Amendment) Act, 1967
 The Holdings (Stay of Execution Proceedings) (Tamil Nadu Amendment) Act, 1957
 The Identification of Prisoners (Tamil Nadu Amendment) Act, 1981
 The Indian Christian Marriage (Extension to Transferred Territory) Act, 1995
 The Indian Criminal Law Amendment (Tamil Nadu) Act, 1950
 The Indian Electricity (Tamil Nadu Amendment) Act, 1980
 The Indian Fisheries (Tamil Nadu Amendment) Act, 1927
 The Indian Lunacy (Tamil Nadu Amendment) Act, 1938
 The Indian Medical Degrees (Tamil Nadu Amendment) Act, 1940
 The Indian Partnership (Tamil Nadu Amendment) Act, 1959
 The Indian Penal Code and the Code of Criminal Procedure (Tamil Nadu Amendment) Act, 1960
 The Indian Registration (Tamil Nadu Amendment) Act, 1974
 The Indian Stamp (Tamil Nadu Amendment) Act, 1958
 The Indian Tolls (Tamil Nadu Amendment) Act, 1942
 The Indian Treasure-Trove (Tamil Nadu Amendment) Act, 1949
 The Industrial Disputes Tamil Nadu (Amendment) Act, 1963
 The Industrial Employment (Standing Orders) Tamil Nadu (Amendment) Act, 1960
 The Kanyakumari Sree-Padam Lands (Abolition and Conversion into Ryotwari) Act, 1972
 The Kanyakumari Sreepandaravaka Lands (Abolition and Conversion into Ryotwari) Act, 1964
 The Kelavarapalli Reservoir Scheme (Acquisition of Land) Act, 1987
 The Koodalmanickam Devaswom Act, 1918
 The Land Acquisition (Tamil Nadu Amendment) Act, 1948
 The Land Improvement Loans (Tamil Nadu Amendment) Act, 1964
 The Legal Practitioners (Tamil Nadu Amendment) Act, 1943
 The Legal Practitioners (Tamil Nadu Amendment) Act, 1960
 The Lepers (Tamil Nadu Repeal) Act, 1987
 The Letters Patent Providing for Sheriff Appointment (Tamil Nadu Amendment) Act, 1983
 The Madras City Civil Court Act, 1892
 The Madras City Land-Revenue Act, 1851
 The Madras City Municipal Corporation Act, 1919
 The Madras City Police (Extension to the City of Madurai and to the City of Coimbatore) Act, 1987
 The Madras City Police Act, 1888
 The Madras Court of Small Causes (Validation of Proceedings) Act, 1943
 The Madras High Court (Jurisdictional Limits) Act, 1927
 The Madras High Court (Jurisdictional Limits) Extension Act, 1985
 The Madras Metropolitan Water Supply and Sewerage Act, 1978
 The Madras Race Club (Acquisition and Transfer of Undertaking) Act, 1986
 The Madras Survey and Boundaries Act, 1923
 The Madras University Act, 1923
 The Madurai City Municipal Corporation Act, 1971
 The Madurai-Kamaraj University Act, 1965
 The Malabar Compensation for Tenants Improvements Act, 1899
 The Malabar Land Registration Act, 1895
 The Malabar Tenancy Act, 1929
 The Malabar Wills Act, 1898
 The Mappilla Maru-Makkattayam Act, 1939
 The Mappilla Wills Act, 1928
 The Mettur Canal Irrigation Cess Act, 1953
 The Mettur Township Act, 1940
 The Minimum Wages (Tamil Nadu Amendment) Act, 1981
 The Mother Teressa Women's University (Amendment) Act, 2002
 The Motor Transport Workers (Tamil Nadu Amendment) Act, 1975
 The Motor Vehicles (Tamil Nadu Amendment) Act, 1948
 The Muslim Personal Law (Shariat) Application (Tamil Nadu Amendment) Act, 1949
 The Nilgiris Game and Fish Preservation Act, 1879
 The Opium and Dangerous Drugs (Tamil Nadu Amendment) Act, 1947
 The Pachaiyappa's Trust (Taking Over of Management) Act, 1981
 The Parambikulam-Aliyar Project (Regulation of Water-Supply) Act, 1993
 The Payment of Wages (Tamil Nadu Amendment) Act, 1959
 The Periyar Irrigation Tanks (Preservation) Act, 1934
 The Periyar University Act, 1997
 The Plantations Labour (Tamil Nadu Amendment) Act, 1996
 The Police (Tamil Nadu Amendment) Act, 1948
 The Presidency Small Cause Courts (Tamil Nadu Amendment) Act, 1927
 The Presidency Small Cause Courts, Code of Civil Procedure and Tamil Nadu Court-Fees and Suits Valuation (Amendment) Act, 1979
 The Presidency Towns Insolvency (Tamil Nadu Amendment) Act, 1943
 The Press and Registration of Books (Tamil Nadu Amendment) Act, 1960
 The Prevention of Insults to National Honour Act, 1957
 The Prince of Arcot Endowments Act, 1922
 The Prisoners Tamil Nadu (Amendment) Act, 1958
 The Prisons and Indian Lunacy (Tamil Nadu Amendment) Act, 1938
 The Provincial Insolvency (Tamil Nadu Amendment) Act, 1953
 The Provincial Small Cause Courts (Tamil Nadu Amendment) Act, 1949
 The Public Wakf's (Extension of Limitation) Tamil Nadu Amendment Act, 1981
 The Pudukkottai (Settlement of Inams) Act, 1955
 The Railway Protection Act, 1886
 The Rajapalayam Municipal Executive Authority (Functions Validation) Act, 1942
 The Salem City Municipal Corporation Act, 1994
 The Sevvalpatti Impartible Estate Act, 1930
 The State Co-Operative Societies (Re-Constitution And Formation) Act, 1954
 The Tamil Nadu (Added Territories) Extension of Laws (No.2) Act, 1961
 The Tamil Nadu (Added Territories) Extension of Laws Act, 1962
 The Tamil Nadu (Added Territories) Extension of Laws Act, 1964
 The Tamil Nadu (Added Territory) Extension of Laws Act, 1961
 The Tamil Nadu (Additional Assessment and Additional Water-Cess) Act, 1963
 The Tamil Nadu (Compulsory Censorship of Film Publicity Materials) Act, 1987
 The Tamil Nadu (Transferred Territory) Extension of Laws Act, 1957
 The Tamil Nadu (Transferred Territory) Extension of Laws Act, 1960
 The Tamil Nadu (Transferred Territory) Extension of Laws Act, 1965
 The Tamil Nadu (Transferred Territory) Extension of Laws Act, 1972
 The Tamil Nadu (Transferred Territory) Jenmikaram Payment Abolition Act, 1964
 The Tamil Nadu (Transferred Territory) Luxury Tax on Tobacco (Validation) Act, 1966
 The Tamil Nadu (Transferred Territory) Ryotwari Settlement Act, 1964
 The Tamil Nadu (Transferred Territory) Thiruppuvaram Payment Abolition Act, 1964
 The Tamil Nadu Abolition of Posts of Part-Time Village Officers Act, 1981
 The Tamil Nadu Acquisition of Hoardings Act, 1985
 The Tamil Nadu Acquisition of Land for Harijan Welfare Schemes Act, 1978
 The Tamil Nadu Acquisition of Land for Industrial Purpose Act, 1997
 The Tamil Nadu Additional Sales Tax Act, 1970
 The Tamil Nadu Admission in Professional Educational Institutions Act, 2006
 The Tamil Nadu Advocates Welfare Fund Act, 1987
 The Tamil Nadu Advocates' Clerks Welfare Fund Act, 1999
 The Tamil Nadu Agricultural Income-Tax Act, 1955
 The Tamil Nadu Agricultural Labourer Fair Wages Act, 1969
 The Tamil Nadu Agricultural Labourers-Farmers (Social Security and Welfare) Act, 2006
 The Tamil Nadu Agricultural Lands Record of Tenancy Rights Act, 1969
 The Tamil Nadu Agricultural Pests and Diseases Act, 1919
 The Tamil Nadu Agricultural Produce Marketing Regulation Act, 1987
 The Tamil Nadu Agricultural Produce Markets (Amendment and Special Provisions) Act, 1978
 The Tamil Nadu Agricultural Produce Markets Act, 1959
 The Tamil Nadu Agricultural Service Co-Operative Societies (Appointment of Special Officers) Act, 1986
 The Tamil Nadu Agriculture Income-Tax (Extension to Added Territory) Act, 1961
 The Tamil Nadu Agriculturists Relief Act, 1938
 The Tamil Nadu Aided Institutions (Prohibition of Transfers of Property) (Extension to Pudukkottai) Act, 1961
 The Tamil Nadu Aided Institutions (Prohibition of Transfers of Property) Act, 1948
 The Tamil Nadu Aliyasantana Act, 1949
 The Tamil Nadu Anatomy Act, 1951
 The Tamil Nadu Ancient and Historical Monuments and Archaeological Sites and Remains Act, 1966
 The Tamil Nadu Animal Preservation Act, 1958
 The Tamil Nadu Animals and Birds in Urban Areas (Control and Regulation) Act, 1997
 The Tamil Nadu Animals and Birds Sacrifices Prohibition Act, 1950
 The Tamil Nadu Apartment Ownership Act, 1994
 The Tamil Nadu Aquaculture (Regulation) Act, 1995
 The Tamil Nadu Backward Class Christians and Backward Class Muslims (Reservation of Seats in Educational Institutions Including Private Educational Institutions and of Appointments or Posts in the Services Under the State) Act, 2007
 The Tamil Nadu Backward Classes, Scheduled Castes and Scheduled Tribes (Reservation of Seats in Educational Institutions and of Appointments or Posts in the Services Under the State) Act, 1993
 The Tamil Nadu Backward Classes, Scheduled Castes and Scheduled Tribes (Reservation of Seats in Private Educational Institutions) Act, 2006
 The Tamil Nadu Betting Tax Act, 1935
 The Tamil Nadu Bhoodan Yagna Act, 1958
 The Tamil Nadu Board of Revenue Abolition Act, 1980
 The Tamil Nadu Board of Revenue Act, 1894
 The Tamil Nadu Borstal Schools Act, 1925
 The Tamil Nadu Building and Construction Workers (Conditions of Employment and Miscellaneous Provisions) Act, 1984
 The Tamil Nadu Buildings (Lease and Rent Control) Validation of Proceedings Act, 1971
 The Tamil Nadu Canals and Public Ferries Act, 1890
 The Tamil Nadu Catering Establishments Act, 1958
 The Tamil Nadu Cattle-Disease Act, 1866
 The Tamil Nadu Children Act, 1920
 The Tamil Nadu Chit Funds Act, 1961
 The Tamil Nadu Christian Marriages Validation Act, 1934
 The Tamil Nadu Christian Marriages Validation Act, 1952
 The Tamil Nadu Cinemas (Regulation) Act, 1955
 The Tamil Nadu Civil Courts Act, 1873
 The Tamil Nadu Co-Operative Land Development Banks Act, 1934
 The Tamil Nadu Co-Operative Societies (Amendment) Act, 1989
 The Tamil Nadu Co-Operative Societies (Appointment of Special Officers) Act, 1976
 The Tamil Nadu Co-Operative Societies (Appointment of Special Officers) Act, 1989
 The Tamil Nadu Co-Operative Societies (Appointment of Special Officers) Act, 1991
 The Tamil Nadu Co-Operative Societies Act, 1961
 The Tamil Nadu Coffee-Stealing Prevention Act, 1878
 The Tamil Nadu Coinage (Alteration of References) Act, 1960
 The Tamil Nadu Commercial Crops Assessment (Repeal) Act, 1980
 The Tamil Nadu Compulsory Censorship of Publicity Materials Act, 1987
 The Tamil Nadu Compulsory Elementary Education Act, 1994
 The Tamil Nadu Compulsory Labour Act, 1858
 The Tamil Nadu Consolidated Fund (Charged Expenditure) Act, 1950
 The Tamil Nadu Contingency Fund Act, 1954
 The Tamil Nadu Corneal Grafting Act, 1960
 The Tamil Nadu Cotton (Trade Stocks) Census Act, 1949
 The Tamil Nadu Cotton Control Act, 1952
 The Tamil Nadu Court of Wards Act, 1902
 The Tamil Nadu Court-Fees and Suits Valuation Act, 1955
 Tamil Nadu Cultivating Tenants (Payment of Fair Rent) Act, 1956
 Tamil Nadu Cultivating Tenants (Protection From Eviction) Act, 1989
 Tamil Nadu Cultivating Tenants (Protection from Eviction) Act, 1997
 Tamil Nadu Cultivating Tenants (Special Provisions) Act, 1968
 Tamil Nadu Cultivating Tenants (Special Provisions) Amendment Act, 1985
 Tamil Nadu Cultivating Tenants Arrears of Rent (Relief) Act, 1972
 Tamil Nadu Cultivating Tenants Arrears of Rent (Relief) Act, 1980
 Tamil Nadu Cultivating Tenants Arrears of Rent (Relief) Amendment Act, 1991
 Tamil Nadu Cultivating Tenants Protection (Continuance) Act, 1965
 Tamil Nadu Cultivating Tenants Protection and Payment of Fair Rent (Extension to Added Territories) Act, 1963
 Tamil Nadu Cultivating Tenants Protection and Payment of Fair Rent (Extension to Kanyakumari District) Act, 1972
 Tamil Nadu Cultivating Tenants Protection and Payment of Fair Rent (Extension to Shencottah Taluk) Act, 1959
 The Tamil Nadu Cyclone and Flood Affected Areas Cultivating Tenants (Special Provisions) Act, 1986
 The Tamil Nadu Cyclone and Flood Affected Areas Cultivating Tenants Arrears of Rent (Relief) Act, 1980
 The Tamil Nadu Debt Conciliation Act, 1936
 The Tamil Nadu Debt Relief Act, 1972
 The Tamil Nadu Debt Relief Act, 1976
 The Tamil Nadu Debt Relief Act, 1978
 The Tamil Nadu Debt Relief Act, 1979
 The Tamil Nadu Debt Relief Act, 1980
 The Tamil Nadu Debt Relief Act, 1982
 The Tamil Nadu Debtors' Protection Act, 1934
 The Tamil Nadu Decentralization Act, 1914
 The Tamil Nadu Devadasis (Prevention of Dedication) Act, 1947
 The Tamil Nadu District Collectors Powers (Delegation) Act, 1956
 The Tamil Nadu District Development Council Act, 1958
 The Tamil Nadu District Development Councils and Panchayats (Extension to Added Territory Act, 1961
 The Tamil Nadu District Limits Act, 1865
 The Tamil Nadu District Municipalities (Extension to the Transferred Territory) Act, 1959
 The Tamil Nadu District Municipalities Act, 1920
 The Tamil Nadu District Police Act, 1859
 The Tamil Nadu Dr. Ambedkar Law University Act, 1996
 The Tamil Nadu Dramatic Performances Act, 1954
 The Tamil Nadu Drugs (Control) Act, 1949
 The Tamil Nadu Drugs and Other Stores (Unlawful Possession) Act, 1986
 The Tamil Nadu Electricity (Taxation on Consumption) Act, 1962
 The Tamil Nadu Electricity Board (Recovery of Dues) Act, 1978
 The Tamil Nadu Electricity Duty (Validation) Act, 1970
 The Tamil Nadu Electricity Duty Act, 1939
 The Tamil Nadu Electricity Supply Undertakings (Acquisition) Act, 1954
 The Tamil Nadu Enfranchised Inams Act, 1862
 The Tamil Nadu Enfranchised Inams Act, 1866
 The Tamil Nadu Entertainments Tax (Special Provision) Act, 1998
 The Tamil Nadu Entertainments Tax (Special Provisions and Validation) Act, 1986
 The Tamil Nadu Entertainments Tax Act, 1939
 The Tamil Nadu Essential Articles Control and Requisitioning (Temporary Powers) Re-Enacting Act, 1956
 The Tamil Nadu Essential Articles Control and Requisitioning Act, 1949
 The Tamil Nadu Essential Services Maintenance Act, 2002
 The Tamil Nadu Estates (Abolition and Conversion into Ryotwari) Act, 1948
 The Tamil Nadu Estates (Supplementary) Act, 1956
 The Tamil Nadu Estates Communal, Forest and Private Lands (Prohibition of Alienation) Act, 1947
 The Tamil Nadu Estates Land (Reduction of Rent) Act, 1947
 The Tamil Nadu Estates Land Act, 1908
 The Tamil Nadu Famine Relief Fund Act, 1936
 The Tamil Nadu Farmer's Management of Irrigation Systems Act, 2000
 The Tamil Nadu Fiscal Responsibility Act, 2003
 The Tamil Nadu Fisherman and Labourers Engaged in Fishing and other Allied Activities (Social Security and Welfare) Act, 2007
 The Tamil Nadu Fleet Operators Stage Carriages (Acquisition) Act, 1971
 The Tamil Nadu Flood Affected Areas Cultivating Tenants (Temporary Relief) Act, 1986
 The Tamil Nadu Forest (Validation) Act, 1882
 The Tamil Nadu Forest Act, 1882
 The Tamil Nadu Gaming Act, 1930
 The Tamil Nadu General Clauses Act, 1867
 The Tamil Nadu General Clauses Act, 1891
 The Tamil Nadu Gift Goods (Unlawful Possession) Act, 1961
 The Tamil Nadu Gramdan Villages (Repayment of Debts) Act, 1959
 The Tamil Nadu Groundwater (Development and Management) Act, 2003
 The Tamil Nadu Hackney Carriage Act, 1911
 The Tamil Nadu Handloom Workers (Conditions of Employment and Miscellaneous Provisions) Act, 1981
 The Tamil Nadu Highways Act, 2001
 The Tamil Nadu Hill Stations (Preservation of Trees) Act, 1955
 The Tamil Nadu Hindu Religious and Charitable Endowments (Special Provisions) Act, 1996
 The Tamil Nadu Hindu Religious and Charitable Endowments Act, 1959
 The Tamil Nadu Home Guard Act, 1963
 The Tamil Nadu Homoeopathy System of Medicine and Practitioners of Homoeopathy Act, 1971
 Tamil Nadu Horse Race (Abolition of Turf Agencies) Act, 1979
 The Tamil Nadu Horse Races (Abolition of Wagering or Betting) Act, 1974
 The Tamil Nadu Impartible Estates Act, 1904
 The Tamil Nadu Inam Abolition Laws (Validation of Proceedings) Act, 1986
 The Tamil Nadu Inam Estates (Abolition and Conversion into Ryotwari) Act, 1963
 The Tamil Nadu Inams (Assessment) Act, 1956
 The Tamil Nadu Inams (Supplementary) Act, 1963
 The Tamil Nadu Inams Act, 1869
 The Tamil Nadu Indebted Agriculturist (Temporary Relief) Act, 1976
 The Tamil Nadu Indebted Agriculturists (Repayment of Debts) Act, 1955
 The Tamil Nadu Indebted Agriculturists (Temporary Relief) Act, 1954
 The Tamil Nadu Indebted Agriculturists (Temporary Relief) Act, 1975
 The Tamil Nadu Indebted Agriculturists and Indebted Persons (Special Provisions) Act, 1976
 The Tamil Nadu Indebted Persons (Temporary Relief) Act, 1975
 The Tamil Nadu Indebted Persons (Temporary Relief) Act, 1976
 The Tamil Nadu Indian Ports (Amendment) Act, 1925
 The Tamil Nadu Industrial Establishments (Conferment of Permanent Status to Workmen) Act, 1981
 The Tamil Nadu Industrial Establishments (National and Festival Holidays) Act, 1958
 The Tamil Nadu Industrial Township Area Development Authority Act, 1997
 The Tamil Nadu Installation of Oil Engines (Temporary Permission) Act, 1954
 The Tamil Nadu Irrigation (Levy of Betterment Contribution) Act, 1955
 The Tamil Nadu Irrigation (Voluntary Cess) Act, 1942
 The Tamil Nadu Irrigation Cess Act, 1865
 The Tamil Nadu Irrigation Tanks (Improvement) Act, 1949
 The Tamil Nadu Irrigation Works (Construction of Field Bothies) Act, 1959
 The Tamil Nadu Irrigation Works (Repair, Improvement and Construction) Act, 1943
 The Tamil Nadu Judicial Proceedings (Regulation of Reports) Act, 1960
 The Tamil Nadu Jute (Control of Prices and Sales) Act, 1950
 The Tamil Nadu Jute Goods Control Act, 1949
 The Tamil Nadu Khadi and Village Industries Board Act, 1959
 The Tamil Nadu Kidneys (Authorities for Use for Therapeutic Purposes) Act, 1987
 The Tamil Nadu Labour Welfare Fund Act, 1972
 The Tamil Nadu Land Improvement Schemes Act, 1959
 The Tamil Nadu Land Reforms (Fixation of Ceiling on Land) Act, 1961
 The Tamil Nadu Land Reforms (Fixation of Ceiling on Land) Act, 1986
 The Tamil Nadu Land Reforms (Reduction of Ceiling on Land) Act, 1970
 The Tamil Nadu Land Revenue and Water-Cess (Surcharge) (Repeal) Act, 1967
 The Tamil Nadu Land-Revenue Assessment Act, 1876
 The Tamil Nadu Lapsed Acts (Removal of Doubts) Act, 1948
 The Tamil Nadu Laws (Special Provisions) Act, 2007
 The Tamil Nadu Laws (Special Provisions) Act, 2008
 The Tamil Nadu Lease-Holds (Abolition and Conversion into Ryotwari) Act, 1963
 The Tamil Nadu Legislature (Prevention of Disqualification) Act, 1967
 The Tamil Nadu Legislature (Prohibition of Simultaneous Membership) Act, 1950
 The Tamil Nadu Levy of Ryotwari Assessment on Free-Hold Lands Act, 1972
 The Tamil Nadu Lifts Act, 1997
 The Tamil Nadu Lignite (Acquisition of Land) Act, 1953
 The Tamil Nadu Limited Proprietors Act, 1911
 The Tamil Nadu Live-Stock Improvement Act, 1940
 The Tamil Nadu Local Authorities Finance Act, 1961
 The Tamil Nadu Local Authorities Loan Act, 1888
 The Tamil Nadu Local Boards (Amendment) Act, 1930
 The Tamil Nadu Manual Worker (Regulation of Employment and Conditions of Work) Act, 1982.
 The Tamil Nadu Marine Fishing Regulation Act, 1983
 The Tamil Nadu Maritime Board Act, 1995
 The Tamil Nadu Marumakkattayam (Removal of Doubts) Act, 1955
 The Tamil Nadu Marumakkattayam Act, 1932
 The Tamil Nadu Maternity Benefit (Repeal) Act, 1964
 The Tamil Nadu Medical Registration Act, 1914
 The Tamil Nadu Medicare Service Persons and Medicare Service Institutions (Prevention of Violence and Damage or Loss of Property) Act, 2008
 The Tamil Nadu Merged States States (Laws) Act, 1949
 The Tamil Nadu Minor Inams (Abolition and Conversion into Ryotwari) Act, 1963
 The Tamil Nadu Money-Lenders Act, 1957
 The Tamil Nadu Motor Vehicles (Special Provisions) (Cancellation of Variations of Conditions of Permit) Act, 1996
 The Tamil Nadu Motor Vehicles (Special Provisions) Act, 1992
 The Tamil Nadu Motor Vehicles (Special Provisions)-Repeal Act, 1991
 The Tamil Nadu Motor Vehicles (Taxation of Passengers and Goods) Amendment Act, 1966
 The Tamil Nadu Motor Vehicles Taxation Act, 1974
 The Tamil Nadu Municipal Authorities (Term  of office and Election of Councilors) Act, 1963
 The Tamil Nadu Municipal Councils (Appointment of Special Officers) Act, 1976
 The Tamil Nadu Municipal Councils (Appointment of Special Officers) Act, 1991
 The Tamil Nadu Municipal Police Act, 1878
 The Tamil Nadu Nambudri Act, 1932
 The Tamil Nadu New Year (Declaration) Act, 2008
 The Tamil Nadu Non-Trading Companies Act, 1972
 The Tamil Nadu Nurses and Midwives Act, 1926
 The Tamil Nadu Occupants of Kudiyiruppu (Conferment of Ownership) Act, 1971
 The Tamil Nadu Occupants of Kudiyiruppu (Protection from Eviction) Act, 1961
 The Tamil Nadu Occupants of Kudiyiruppu (Protection from Eviction) Re-enacting Act, 1975
 The Tamil Nadu Official Language Act, 1956
 The Tamil Nadu Official Seals Act, 1865
 The Tamil Nadu Oil Palm (Regulation of Production and Processing) Act, 1994
 The Tamil Nadu Open Places (Prevention of Disfigurement) Act, 1959
 The Tamil Nadu Open University Act, 2002
 The Tamil Nadu Outports Landing and Shipping Fees Act, 1885
 The Tamil Nadu Panchayat Court (Validation of Proceedings) Act, 1970
 The Tamil Nadu Panchayat Union Councils (Appointment of Special Officers) Act, 1977
 The Tamil Nadu Panchayat Union Councils (Extension of Term  of offices) Act, 1976
 The Tamil Nadu Panchayat Union Councils (Special Provisions for First Constitution) Act, 1960
 The Tamil Nadu Panchayats (Appointment of Special Officers) Act, 1979
 The Tamil Nadu Panchayats (Extension of Term  of office) Act, 1976
 The Tamil Nadu Panchayats (Extension to Transferred Territory) and Panchayat Union Councils (Special Provisions for First Constitution) Amendment Act, 1961
 The Tamil Nadu Panchayats (Validation of Local Cess Surcharge) Act, 1982
 The Tamil Nadu Panchayats Act, 1958
 The Tamil Nadu Panchayats Act, 1994
 The Tamil Nadu Panchayats and Panchayat Union Councils (Appointment of Special Officers) Act, 1991
 The Tamil Nadu Panchayats and Panchayat Union Councils (Extension of Term  of office) Act, 1975
 The Tamil Nadu Parks, Play-Fields and Open Spaces (Preservation and Regulation) Act, 1959
 The Tamil Nadu Patta Pass Book Act, 1983
 The Tamil Nadu Pawn Brokers Act, 1943
 The Tamil Nadu Payment of Salaries Act, 1951
 The Tamil Nadu Payment of Subsistence Allowance Act, 1981
 The Tamil Nadu Physical Education and Sports University Act, 2004
 The Tamil Nadu Places of Public Resort Act, 1888
 The Tamil Nadu Preservation of Private Forests (Continuance) Act, 1965
 The Tamil Nadu Preservation of Private Forests (Extension to Kanyakumari District) Act, 1979
 The Tamil Nadu Preservation of Private Forests Act, 1949
 The Tamil Nadu Prevention of Begging Act, 1945
 The Tamil Nadu Prevention of Couching Act, 1945
 The Tamil Nadu Prevention of Dangerous Activities of Bootleggers, Drug Offenders, Goondas, Immoral Traffic Offenders and Slum-Grabbers, Act, 1982
 The Tamil Nadu Prevention of Incitement to Refuse or Defer Payment of Tax Act, 1981
 The Tamil Nadu Private Clinical Establishments (Regulation) Act, 1997
 The Tamil Nadu Private Colleges (Regulation) Act, 1976
 The Tamil Nadu Private Educational Institutions (Regulation) Act, 1966
 The Tamil Nadu Private Electricity Supply Undertakings (Acquisition) Act, 1973
 The Tamil Nadu Private Forests (Assumption of Management) Act, 1961
 The Tamil Nadu Prize Schemes (Prohibition) Act, 1979
 The Tamil Nadu Prohibition (Revival of Operation and Amendment) Act, 1974
 The Tamil Nadu Prohibition (Supplementary) Act, 1941
 The Tamil Nadu Prohibition Act, 1937
 The Tamil Nadu Prohibition of Charging Exorbitant Interest Act, 2003
 The Tamil Nadu Prohibition of Eve-Teasing Act, 1998
 The Tamil Nadu Prohibition of Forcible Conversion of Religion Act, 2002
 The Tamil Nadu Prohibition of Ragging Act, 1997
 The Tamil Nadu Prohibition of Ritual and Practice of Burying Alive of a Person Act, 2002
 The Tamil Nadu Prohibition of Smoking and Spitting Act, 2002
 The Tamil Nadu Proprietary Estates Village Service and the Tamil Nadu Hereditary Village-Offices (Repeal) Act, 1968
 The Tamil Nadu Public Health Act, 1939
 The Tamil Nadu Public Libraries Act, 1948
 The Tamil Nadu Public Men Council (Criminal Misconduct) Repeal Act, 1977
 The Tamil Nadu Public Premises (Eviction of Unauthorised Occupants) Act, 1975
 The Tamil Nadu Public Property (Prevention of Damage and Loss) Act, 1992
 The Tamil Nadu Public Property (Prevention of Destruction and Loss) Act, 1982
 The Tamil Nadu Public Property Malversation Act, 1837
 The Tamil Nadu Public Trusts (Regulation of Administration of Agricultural Lands) Act, 1961
 The Tamil Nadu Public Works Engineering Corporation Limited (Acquisition And Miscellaneous Provisions) Act, 1980
 The Tamil Nadu Re-Enacting (No.2) Act, 1948
 The Tamil Nadu Re-Enacting (No.3) Act, 1948
 The Tamil Nadu Re-Enacting Act, 1949
 The Tamil Nadu Re-Enacting and Repealing (No.1) Act, 1948
 The Tamil Nadu Recognised Private Schools (Regulation) Act, 1973
 The Tamil Nadu References to Magistrates in Laws (Special Provisions) Act, 1980
 The Tamil Nadu Registration of Births and Deaths Act, 1899
 The Tamil Nadu Registration of Practitioners of Integrated Medicine Act, 1956
 The Tamil Nadu Registration of Veterinary Practitioners Act, 1957
 The Tamil Nadu Regulation of Admission in Professional Courses Act, 2006
 The Tamil Nadu Relief Undertakings (Special Provisions) Act, 1969
 The Tamil Nadu Rent and Revenue Sales Act, 1839
 The Tamil Nadu Repatriates (Bar of Proceedings) Act, 1969
 The Tamil Nadu Repealing and Amending Act, 1951
 The Tamil Nadu Repealing and Amending Act, 1952
 The Tamil Nadu Repealing and Amending Act, 1955
 The Tamil Nadu Repealing and Amending Act, 1957
 The Tamil Nadu Requisitioning and Acquisition of Immovable Property Act, 1956
 The Tamil Nadu Requisitioning of Motor Vehicles Act, 1970
 The Tamil Nadu Restriction of Habitual Offenders Act, 1948
 The Tamil Nadu Revenue Commissioner Act, 1849
 The Tamil Nadu Revenue Enquiries Act, 1893
 The Tamil Nadu Revenue Recovery Act, 1864
 The Tamil Nadu Revenue Summonses Act, 1869
 The Tamil Nadu Revision of Tariff Rates on Supply of Electrical Energy Act, 1978
 The Tamil Nadu Right to Information Act, 1997
 The Tamil Nadu Rinderpest Act, 1940
 The Tamil Nadu Rivers Conservancy Act, 1884
 The Tamil Nadu Rosewood Trees (Conservation) Act, 1994
 The Tamil Nadu Rural Artisans (Conferment of Ownership of Kudiyiruppu) Act, 1976
 The Tamil Nadu Sale Tax (Settlement of Arrears) Act, 2006
 The Tamil Nadu Sales of Motor Spirit Taxation Act, 1939
 The Tamil Nadu Sales Tax (Settlement of Arrears) Act, 2008
 The Tamil Nadu Sales Tax (Settlement of Disputes) Act, 2002
 The Tamil Nadu Sales Tax (Surcharge) Act, 1971
 The Tamil Nadu Sales Tax Entertainments Tax and Luxury Tax (Settlement of Disputes) Act, 1999
 The Tamil Nadu Scrap Merchants and Dealers in Second-Hand Property and Owners of Automobile Workshops and Tinker Shops (Regulation, Control and Licensing) Act, 1985
 The Tamil Nadu Siddha System of Medicine (Development And Registration of Practitioners) Act, 1997
 The Tamil Nadu Silkworm Diseases (Prevention and Eradication) Act, 1948
 The Tamil Nadu Silkworm Seed (Production, Supply and Distribution) Act, 1956
 The Tamil Nadu Slum Areas (Improvement and Clearance) Act, 1971
 The Tamil Nadu Societies Registration Act, 1975
 The Tamil Nadu Special Economic Zones (Special Provisions) Act, 2005
 The Tamil Nadu Special Security Group Act, 1993
 The Tamil Nadu Specified Commodities Markets (Regulation of Location) Act, 1996
 The Tamil Nadu Stage Carriages and Contract Carriages (Acquisition) Act, 1973
 The Tamil Nadu Stamp (Increase of Duties) Act, 1962
 The Tamil Nadu State Aid to Industries Act, 1922
 The Tamil Nadu State Commission for Women Act, 2008
 The Tamil Nadu State Council for Higher Education Act, 1992
 The Tamil Nadu State Housing Board Act, 1961
 The Tamil Nadu State Legislature (Continuance of Use of English Language) Act, 1964
 The Tamil Nadu State Wakf Board (Validation of Functions of Special Officer) Act, 1975
 The Tamil Nadu Sugar Cane Cess (Validation) Act, 1963
 The Tamil Nadu Sugar Factories Control Act, 1949
 The Tamil Nadu Suppression of Disturbances Act, 1948
 The Tamil Nadu Survey and Boundaries Act, 1923 (Validation) Act, 1924
 The Tamil Nadu Tamil Learning Act, 2006
 The Tamil Nadu Tax on Consumption or Sale of Electricity Act, 2003
 The Tamil Nadu Tax on Entry of Goods into Local Areas Act, 2001
 The Tamil Nadu Tax on Luxuries in Hotels and Lodging Houses Act, 1981
 The Tamil Nadu Tax on Professions, Trades, Callings and Employments Act, 1992
 The Tamil Nadu Taxation Laws (Inapplicability of Limitation) Act, 1985
 The Tamil Nadu Taxation Special Tribunal Act, 1992
 The Tamil Nadu Teachers Education University Act, 2008
 The Tamil Nadu Temple Entry Authorization Act, 1947
 The Tamil Nadu Tenants and Ryots Protection Act, 1949
 The Tamil Nadu Town and Country Planning Act, 1971
 The Tamil Nadu Towns Nuisances Act, 1889
 The Tamil Nadu Traffic Control Act, 1938
 The Tamil Nadu Transferred Territory) Re-Enacting Act, 1957
 The Tamil Nadu Transparency in Tenders Act, 1998
 The Tamil Nadu Tuberculosis Sanatoria (Regulation of Buildings) Act, 1947
 The Tamil Nadu Urban Land (Ceiling and Regulation) Act, 1978
 The Tamil Nadu Urban Land Tax Act, 1966
 The Tamil Nadu Urban Local Bodies (Suspension of Operation) Act, 2000
 The Tamil Nadu Urban Local Bodies Act, 1998
 The Tamil Nadu Value Added Tax Act, 2006
 The Tamil Nadu Veterinary and Animal Sciences University Act, 1989
 The Tamil Nadu Village Courts Act, 1888
 The Tamil Nadu Wakf (Supplementary) Act, 1961
 The Tamil Nadu Wakf Board (Appointment of Special Officers) Act, 1991
 The Tamil Nadu Water Supply and Drainage Board Act, 1970
 The Tamil Nadu Weights and Measures (Enforcement) Act, 1958
 The Tamil Nadu Welfare Board for the Disabled Persons Act, 2007
 The Tamil Nadu Wild Elephants Preservation Act, 1873
 The Tamil Nadu, Bengal and Bombay Children (Supplementary) Act, 1925
 The Tamil University Act, 1982
 The Tanjore Chattram Endowments (Use) Act, 1942
 The Tanjore Pannaiyal Protection Act, 1952
 The Thiruvalluvar University Act, 2002
 The Tiruchirappalli City Municipalities Corporation Act, 1994
 The Tiruchirappalli Kaiaeruvaram and Mattuvaram (Extension of Application) Act, 1964
 The Tiruchirappalli Kaiaeruvaram and Mattuvaram Act, 1958
 The Tirunelveli City Municipal Corporation Act, 1994
 The Tiruppur City Municipal Corporation Act, 2008
 The Toothukudi City Municipal Corporation Act, 2008
 The Travancore-Cochin Lime-Shells (Control) Repeal Act, 1964
 The Tuticorin Port Trust Act, 1924
 The Usurious Loans (Tamil Nadu Amendment) Act, 1936
 The Velliyakundam Impartible Estate Act, 1933
 The Vellore City Municipal Corporation Act, 2008
 The Vexatious Litigation (Prevention) Act, 1949
 The Wakf (Tamil Nadu Amendment) Act, 1982
 Tamil Nadu Agricultural Income Tax Act
 Tamil Nadu Cultivating Tenants Protection Act
 Tamil Nadu District Development Councils Act 1958
 Tamil Nadu and Village Industries Board Act
 Tamil Nadu Land Reforms [Fixation and Ceiling on Land]
 Tamil Nadu Motor Vehicles Taxation Act
 Baharathidasan University Act
 The Tamil Nadu Chit Fund Act & Rules
 Tamil Nadu Dr MGR Medical Chennai University Act
 The Manonmaniam /Sundranar University
 The Land Reforms Special Appellate Tribunal Regulation
 Tamil Nadu Panchayats Act
 Tamil Nadu Societies Registration Act
 The Tamil Nadu Prohibition of Smoking and Spitting Act 2002
 The Tamil Nadu Highways Act 2001
 The Tamil Nadu Sales Tax [Settlement of Disputes] Act 2002
 The Tamil Nadu Tax on Entry of Goods in to Local Areas Act 2001
 Tamil Nadu Farmer's Management of Irrigation Systems Act 2000
 Tamil Nadu Advocates Clerks Welfare Fund Act 1999
 Tamil Nadu Sales Tax Entertainments Tax and Luxury Tax Settlements of Disputes Act 1999
 The Tamil Nadu Acquisition of Land for Industrial Purposes 1998
 Tamil Nadu Prohibition of Harassment of Women Act, 1998
 Tamil Nadu Transparency in Tenders Act 1998
 Tamil Nadu Animals and Birds in Urban areas Control and Regulation Act 1997
 Tamil Nadu Protection of Interests of Depositors in Financial Establishment Act 1997
 The Tamil Nadu Lifts Act 1997
 The Tamil Nadu Siddha System of Medicine Development and Registration of Practitioner Act 1997
 Tamil Nadu Industrial Township Area Development Authority Act 1997
 Tamil Nadu Right Information Act 1997
 Tamil Nadu Prohibition of Ragging Act 1997
 Tamil Nadu Private Clinical Establishments (Regulation) Act 1997
 Tamil Nadu Specified Commodities Markets Regulation of Location Act 1996
 Tamil Nadu Motor Vehicles Special Provisions Cancellation of Variations of Conditions of Permit Act 1996
 Tamil Nadu Maritime Board Act 1995
 Tamil Nadu Compulsory Elementary Education Act 1994
 Tamil Nadu Apartments Owner ship act 1994
 Tamil Nadu Aquaculture Regulation Act 1995
 Tamil Nadu Rosewood Trees Conservation Act 1994
 The Tamil Nadu Palm (Regulation of Production and Processing) Act 1994
 Tamil Nadu Palm Products Development Board Act
 Tamil Nadu Property Prevention of Damage and Loss 1992
 Tamil Nadu Agricultural Produce Marketing Act 1987
 Tamil Nadu Drugs and Other Stores (Unlawful Possession) Act
 Tamil Nadu Compulsory Censorship of Family Publicity Materials Act
 Tamil Nadu Compulsory of Censorship of Publicity Materials Act
 The Tamil Nadu Kidney's (Authority for use for the rapetic purposes) Act 1987
 The Tamil Nadu Scrap merchants and Dealers in Second Hand Property and Owners of Automobile Work Shop and Tinker Shops Regulation Control and Licensing act
 Tamil Nadu Advertisements Tax Act
 The Tamil Nadu Prohibition of Harassment Women Act
 The Tamil Nadu Prohibition of Forcible Conversion of Religion Act 2002
 The Tamil Nadu Taxation Special Tribunal Act-1992
 The Tamil Nadu Entertainments Tax Act
 Tamil Nadu Hindu Religious and Charitable Endowments Act 1959
 Tamil Nadu Prohibition of Ritual and Practice of Burying a live of a Person Act 2002
 The Taminadu Pawn Brokers Act & Rules 1943
 Tamil Nadu State Aid to Industries Act, 1922
 Tamil Nadu Agricultural Labourers – Farmers Act 2006

See also 
 Government of Tamil Nadu
 Department of Law (Tamil Nadu)
 Madras High Court
 Gazette of Tamil Nadu
 Constitution of India
 Uniform civil code of India
 Law of India
 Indian Penal Code
 Supreme Court of India

References

External links 
 http://www.lawnotes.in/Tamil_Nadu_Acts  LawNotes.in
  http://www.lawsofindia.org/state/26/Tamil%20Nadu.html  laws of india.org

Government of Tamil Nadu
Tamil Nadu-related lists
Tamil Nadu state legislation
Law of India